This is a list of memorials in Singapore:

Bukit Batok Memorial
The Cenotaph
Civilian War Memorial
Elephant statue at the Old Parliament House
Dalhousie Obelisk
Former Indian National Army Monument
Kranji War Memorial
Lim Bo Seng Memorial
Nanyang University Memorial
Raffles' Landing Site Statue
Sun Yat Sen Nanyang Memorial Hall
Tan Kim Seng Fountain
SGH War Memorial

See also
List of museums in Singapore

References

Notes

Bibliography